William Warren is the name of:

 Sir William Warren (died 1602), Irish landowner, statesman and soldier
 William Warren (actor) (1812–1888), American actor
 William Warren (elder actor) (1767–1832), American actor
 William Warren (entomologist) (1839–1914), English entomologist
 William Warren (politician) (1879–1927), Premier of Newfoundland
 William C. Warren (1836–1870), first regularly employed law enforcement officer in the city of Los Angeles
 William Fairfield Warren (1833–1929), first President of Boston University
 William H. Warren, American psychologist
 William Henry Warren (1852–1926), English-born engineer, active in Australia from 1881
 William J. Warren (born 1939), Canadian lawyer and University chancellor
 William John Finley Warren (1873–1963), politician in Saskatchewan, Canada
 William K. Warren Sr. (1897–1990), American businessman and philanthropist of Tulsa, Oklahoma
William T. Warren(1877 - 1962), American architect 
 William W. Warren (1834–1880), American Representative from Massachusetts
 William Whipple Warren (1825–1853), Ojibwa historian
 Bill Warren (baseball) (1884–1960), American baseball player
 Bill Warren (businessman), American corporate human resource executive
 Bill Warren (communist) (1935–1978)
 Bill Warren (film historian and critic) (1943–2016), American film historian and critic

See also 
 Warren (name)
 Warren William (movie actor 1894–1948)